Nicholas I Sanudo (or Niccolò; died 1341) was the fifth Duke of the Archipelago from 1323 to his death. He was the son and successor of William I of the House of Sanudo. 

Nicholas fought under his brother-in-law Walter, Duke of Athens, at the disastrous Battle of Halmyros on 15 March 1311. He was one of the few knights on the losing side to escape with his life and liberty.

When John of Gravina, the Prince of Achaea, came to the Morea in 1325 in an attempt to reverse the recent Byzantine gains, Nicholas, as a vassal of Achaea, went to his assistance. He fought in John of Gravina's futile siege of the castle of Karytaina, and when John left the Morea in spring 1326, he entrusted Nicholas with the conduct of military operations. At some point thereafter, he scored a success against a numerically superior Byzantine army that was raiding the Principality. After that, he left the Morea. Nicholas was the last Duke of Naxos to command troops in the mainland.

He was succeeded by his brother John I. His other brother was Marco Sanudo, Lord of Milos.

Family
Nicholas was married to Joanna of Brienne, the daughter of Hugues de Brienne, Count of Lecce (c. 1240 – 1296) and Helena Komnene Doukaina, a daughter of John I Doukas of Thessaly.

References

Sources 
 
 
 
 
 

1341 deaths
Nicholas 01
Nicholas 01
Year of birth unknown
14th-century Venetian people